Ciliopagurus is a genus of hermit crabs, of the family Diogenidae, which are sometimes referred to as the "left-handed hermit crabs", because in contrast to most other hermit crabs, the left chela (claw) is enlarged instead of the right. They are found in the Indo-Pacific region and in the eastern Atlantic Ocean.

Species

Ciliopagurus albatrossi Forest, 1995
Ciliopagurus alcocki Forest, 1995
Ciliopagurus babai Forest, 1995
Ciliopagurus caparti (Forest, 1952)
Ciliopagurus galzini Poupin & Malay, 2009
Ciliopagurus haigae Forest, 1995
Ciliopagurus hawaiiensis (McLaughlin & Baily-Brock, 1975)
Ciliopagurus krempfi (Forest, 1952)
Ciliopagurus liui Forest, 1995
Ciliopagurus macrolepis Forest, 1995
Ciliopagurus major Forest, 1995
† Ciliopagurus obesus van Bakel, Jagt & Fraaije, 2003
Ciliopagurus pacificus Forest, 1995
Ciliopagurus plessisi Forest, 1995
Ciliopagurus shebae (Lewinsohn, 1969)
Ciliopagurus strigatus (Herbst, 1804)
† Ciliopagurus substriatiformis (Lorenthey, 1929)
Ciliopagurus tenebrarum (Alcock, 1905)
Ciliopagurus tricolor Forest, 1995
Ciliopagurus vakovako Poupin, 2001

References

External links

Diogenidae
Extant Rupelian first appearances
Rupelian genus first appearances